DTAP may refer to:
 DTaP, a vaccine for diphtheria, tetanus and acellular pertussis
 DTAP, a software development approach
 Direct Transfer Application Part (DTAP), a radio telecommunication protocol for GSM or CDMA
 Direct internet TAP